DeAnne Hemmens (born July 2, 1964) is an American sprint kayak who competed in the mid-1990s. At the 1996 Summer Olympics in Atlanta, she was eliminated in the semifinals of both the K-2 500 m and the K-4 500 m events.

She later competed in both surf ski and lifesaving events.

References

Sports-Reference.com profile

1964 births
American female canoeists
Canoeists at the 1996 Summer Olympics
Living people
Olympic canoeists of the United States
21st-century American women